Earl of Selborne, in the County of Southampton, is a title in the Peerage of the United Kingdom. It was created in 1882 for the lawyer and Liberal politician Roundell Palmer, 1st Baron Selborne, along with the subsidiary title of Viscount Wolmer, of Blackmoor in the County of Southampton. He had already been made Baron Selborne, of Selborne in the County of Southampton, in 1872, also in the Peerage of the United Kingdom. Both his son, the second Earl, and grandson, the third Earl, were prominent Liberal Unionist politicians. The latter was in 1941 called to the House of Lords through a writ of acceleration in his father's barony of Selborne. The third Earl's grandson, the fourth Earl, served as one of the ninety elected hereditary peers that remain in the House of Lords after the passing of the House of Lords Act 1999, and sat as a Conservative. As of 2021, the titles are held by the latter's son, the fifth earl, who succeeded his father in that year.

The family seat is Temple Manor, near Selborne, Hampshire.

Barons Selborne (1872)
 Roundell Palmer, 1st Baron Selborne (1812–1895) (created Earl of Selborne in 1882)

Earls of Selborne (1882)
 Roundell Palmer, 1st Earl of Selborne (1812–1895)
 William Waldegrave Palmer, 2nd Earl of Selborne (1859–1942)
 Roundell Cecil Palmer, 3rd Earl of Selborne (1887–1971)
 William Matthew Palmer, Viscount Wolmer (1912–1942). 
 John Roundell Palmer, 4th Earl of Selborne (1940–2021)
 William Lewis Palmer, 5th Earl of Selborne (born 1971)

Present peer
William Lewis Palmer, 5th Earl of Selborne (born 1 September 1971) is the eldest of the three sons of the 4th Earl and his wife Joanna Van Antwerp James. Styled formally as Viscount Wolmer from birth, he was educated at Eton College,  Christ Church, Oxford, and the Institute of Development Studies at Sussex University. He succeeded to the peerages on 12 February 2021.

The heir apparent is his elder son, Alexander David Palmer, Viscount Wolmer (born 2002).

Heraldry
Arms of Palmer: Argent, on two bars sable three trefoils slipped of the field in chief a greyhound courant of the second collard or. Crest: On a mount vert a greyhound sejant sable collared or charged on the shoulder with a trefoil slipped argent. Supporters: On either side a greyhound sable collared or and charged on the shoulder with a trefoil argent.

See also
 Ralph Palmer, 12th Baron Lucas

References

 

Earldoms in the Peerage of the United Kingdom
Noble titles created in 1882
Noble titles created for UK MPs
Peerages created for the Lord High Chancellor of Great Britain